Senator Ives may refer to:

Edward H. Ives (1819–1892), Wisconsin State Senate
Eugene S. Ives (1859–1917), New York State Senate
Gideon S. Ives (1846–1927), Minnesota State Senate
Irving Ives (1896–1962), U.S. Senator from New York from 1947 to 1959